Galesville or Galeville may refer to:

Education
United States
Galesville University, a defunct college in Wisconsin

Places
United States
Galeville, New York, unincorporated community in Onondaga County
Galeville Military Airport, nearby, defunct, now Shawangunk Grasslands National Wildlife Refuge
Galesville, Illinois, unincorporated community
Galesville, Maryland, unincorporated community
Galesville, Wisconsin, city

See also
Gale (disambiguation)